Clavascidium sinense is a species of squamulose (scaley), ground-dwelling lichen in the family Verrucariaceae. Found in Northwest China, it was formally described as a new species in 2022 by Tingting Zhang and Xinli Wei. The species epithet sinense refers to its Chinese distribution.

Characteristics of Clavascidium sinense include the presence of both uniseriate (lined up in a single row) and biseriate (lined up in two rows) ascospores in the asci, pycnidia that are superficial on the surface of the squamules (laminal), and mixed-type medulla (with both rounded and elongated cells). The lichen does not react with any of the standard chemical spot tests, and no lichen products were detected using thin-layer chromatography.

References

Verrucariales
Lichen species
Lichens described in 2022
Lichens of China